Barnaby Lee is a 1917 American silent historical drama film directed by Edward H. Griffith and starring John Tansey, Samuel N. Niblack and Hugh Thompson.

Cast
 John Tansey as Barnaby Lee
 Samuel N. Niblack as Harry Lee
 Hugh Thompson as John King
 Charles Edwards as Philip Calvert
 William Wadsworth as Gunner Kieger
 Jack Ridgeway as The Schout Fiskaal
 Norbert Wicki as Mynheer Van Swringen
 Claire Adams as Dorothy Van Swearingen 
 Jessie Stevens as Mevrouw Barbara Van Swearingen
 Joseph Burke as Peter Stuyvesant
 Alexander Rene as Charles Calvert

References

Bibliography
 Alan Gevinson. Within Our Gates: Ethnicity in American Feature Films, 1911-1960. University of California Press, 1997.

External links
 

1917 films
1917 drama films
1910s historical drama films
American historical drama films
1910s English-language films
American silent feature films
American black-and-white films
Films directed by Edward H. Griffith
Edison Studios films
Films set in the 17th century
1910s American films
Silent American drama films